Ali Kandi or Alikandi may refer to:
 Ali Kandi, East Azerbaijan
 Ali Kandi, Hormozgan
 Ali Kandi, Showt, West Azerbaijan Province
 Ali Kandi, Qarah Quyun, Showt County, West Azerbaijan Province
 Ali Kandi, Urmia, West Azerbaijan Province